Abhai Chandavimol ( 1907-1993), the Thai Minister of Education served on the World Scout Committee of the World Organization of the Scout Movement from 1965 to 1971, representing The National Scout Organization of Thailand.

In 1971, Chandavimol was awarded the Bronze Wolf, the only distinction of the World Organization of the Scout Movement, awarded by the World Scout Committee for exceptional services to world Scouting, at the 22nd World Scout Conference.

Honour 
received the following royal decorations in the Honours System of Thailand:
 1967 -  Knight Grand Cordon of the Most Exalted Order of the White Elephant
 1963 -  Knight Grand Cordon of the Most Noble Order of the Crown of Thailand
 1965 -  Dame Grand Commander of the Most Illustrious Order of Chula Chom Klao
 1988 -  Member of the Order of Symbolic Propitiousness Ramkeerati
 1941 -  Medal for Service Rendered in the Interior (Indochina)
 1962 -  Border Service Medal 
 1951 -  Chakrabarti Mala Medal 
 1971 -  King Rama IX Royal Cypher Medal 3rd
  First Class (gold medal) of Red Cross Medal of Appreciation

References

Dr. László Nagy, 250 Million Scouts, The World Scout Foundation and Dartnell Publishers, 1985, complete list through 1981, from which the French Scoutopedia article is sourced

External links
French Scoutopedia article

Recipients of the Bronze Wolf Award
World Scout Committee members
Abhai Chandavimol
1907 births
1993 deaths
Alumni of the University of Cambridge
Abhai Chandavimol